NMC Music is an Israeli record label. It was established in 1964 as a subsidiary company of CBS, and became independent in 1988.

Artists represented by NMC include Noa Kirel, Mashina, Yehuda Poliker, Shlomi Shabat, Chava Alberstein, Ehud Banai, Meir Banai and T-Slam.

See also
 List of record labels

External links
 songs.co.il - NMC Music official download site (a partnership with Walla!)

Israeli independent record labels
Record labels established in 1964
Pop record labels
Rock record labels
IFPI members